John "Jake" Burns (born 21 February 1958) is a singer and guitarist, and is best known as the frontman of Stiff Little Fingers, although he has also recorded with Jake Burns and the Big Wheel, 3 Men + Black, and as a solo artist.

Early life 
Burns was born in Belfast, Northern Ireland, and grew up in Joanmount in Ballysillan. Burns' mother was a seamstress, and his father was a machinist in a textile machinery factory/steel foundry, where he was a shop steward, and his socialist views were an influence on Burns. Prior to punk, Burns' musical influences included Rory Gallagher, Dr. Feelgood, Graham Parker, and Bob Marley.

Career

Stiff Little Fingers 

Burns started off his career at Belfast Boys' Model School with a rock covers band, Highway Star, which consisted of Burns, Gordon Blair, Henry Cluney, and Brian Faloon. Gordon Blair subsequently left the group to join Rudi, and Ali McMordie joined, about the time the band discovered punk.

They were briefly named The Fast, but as there was already a group of that name they changed it to Stiff Little Fingers, taken from the song of the same name that had appeared on Pure Mania, the 1977 album by The Vibrators. 

Apart from a five-year gap from 1983 to 1987, Stiff Little Fingers have been active since 1977 to the present day and have released ten studio albums.

Solo work 
In 1981, Burns made his acting debut in an episode of the BBC's Play For Today series entitled Iris in the Traffic, Ruby in the Rain, written by Belfast-born poet and playwright Stewart Parker, which also featured the rest of Stiff Little Fingers effectively playing themselves as 'The Band'.

After the breakup of SLF in 1983, Burns formed Jake Burns and the Big Wheel. The band consisted of Burns on vocals and guitar, Steve Grantley on drums, Sean Martin on bass guitar, and Pete Saunders on keyboards. Big Wheel recorded a total of three singles, "On Fortune Street", "She Grew Up" and "Breathless". A compilation album, also called On Fortune Street, was released after the band's demise, in 2002.

In 1987, Burns disbanded Big Wheel, and Stiff Little Fingers reformed, because they were "skint and wanted to make a bit of cash to get back to Ireland for Christmas".

From about 2001 to 2005, Burns was involved in a side project with Pauline Black of The Selecter, called 3 Men and Black. This involved Black touring with three male artists from the late 1970s, early 1980s doing acoustic versions of songs they are famous for, and talking a little about how they came to write the songs etc. The line up for the concerts was fairly fluid, and has included such people as Bruce Foxton, J.J. Burnel, Eric Faulkner and Nick Welsh.

On 27 March 2006, Burns released a solo album titled Drinkin' Again.

In 2009, Burns formed a Chicago punk rock supergroup called The Nefarious Fat Cats to raise money for local charities. Notable members include John Haggerty (Pegboy, Naked Raygun), Joe Haggerty (Pegboy), Joe Principe (Rise Against), Scott Lucas (Local H), Herb Rosen (Beer Nuts, Right of the Accused) and Mark DeRosa (Dummy). Mr. Burns also contributed guitar and vocals on a track of The Black Sheep Band charity record for Children's Memorial Hospital, A Chicago Punk Rock Collaboration for the Kids, Vol 1.

In 2016, Burns joined an acoustic "supergroup" formed by Kirk Brandon, of Spear of Destiny called Dead Men Walking which also included David Ruffy and John "Segs" Jennings, both of Ruts DC.

Personal life 
Burns lived in London for over ten years from 1978 after Stiff Little Fingers had relocated there. His first wife lived in Newcastle upon Tyne, and after their marriage, he moved to Newcastle, where he lived for 16 years, becoming a supporter of Newcastle United F.C. He is also an avid supporter of the Northern Ireland national football team.

Burns' second wife, Shirley, is American and they have lived in Chicago since 2004. Burns would eventually become a US citizen, partially so he could help vote out Donald Trump.

Discography

With Stiff Little Fingers 
see Stiff Little Fingers#Discography

Jake Burns and the Big Wheel 
Albums
On Fortune Street (2002), EMI

Singles
"She Grew Up" (1984), Rigid Digits – UK Independent no. 36
"On Fortune Street" (1985), Rigid Digits
"Breathless" (1987), Jive – UK no. 99

With 3 Men + Black 
Acoustic (2005), A2E

With Dead Men Walking 
Unofficially Official: Live In Bristol 2016 (2016)

With Ruts DC and Kirk Brandon 
"Kill the Pain" (2017), Westworld Recordings

Solo 
Albums
Drinkin' Again (2006), EMI

Compilation appearances
Poxmen of the Horslypse: A Tribute to Horslips (2017), Shite'n'Onions: "Warm Sweet Breath of Love"

References

External links 
Stiff Little Fingers website

1958 births
Living people
British anti-fascists
British rock guitarists
British male guitarists
Punk rock musicians from Northern Ireland
Male singers from Northern Ireland
Musicians from Belfast
Stiff Little Fingers members
Dead Men Walking members